Dakhla Airport  is an airport serving Dakhla (also known as Dajla or ad-Dakhla, formerly Villa Cisneros), a city in Western Sahara, a disputed territory. (See Political status of Western Sahara)

The airport is operated by the Moroccan state-owned company ONDA.

History
During World War II, the airport was used by the United States Army Air Forces Air Transport Command as a stopover for cargo, transiting aircraft and personnel on the North African Cairo-Dakar transport route for cargo, transiting aircraft and personnel. It connected to Dakar Airport in the South and Agadir Airport to the north.

Airport and facilities
The Dakhla airport is used as public airport and by the Royal Moroccan Air Force.

Public facilities available include a medical post and a prayer room.

The airport offers the following radio-navigation aids: VOR and DME.

Airlines and destinations
The following airlines operate regular scheduled and charter flights at Dakhla Airport:

Traffic statistics

References

External links
 
 

Airports in Morocco
Airfields of the United States Army Air Forces Air Transport Command in North Africa
World War II airfields in Spanish Sahara
Buildings and structures in Dakhla-Oued Ed-Dahab